Blue fescue is a common name for several plant species and may refer to:

 Festuca glauca
 Festuca longifolia
 Festuca pallens